Calvary Christian Academy (CCA) is a private Christian school located in Fort Lauderdale, Florida, United States. It was established as a ministry of Calvary Chapel Fort Lauderdale in 2000. CCA provides education from Pre-K3 through 12th grade. A full-time daycare is also operated all year. The school is accredited with the Association of Christian Schools International. The student population totals to more than 1,900 and the student teacher ratio is 12:1.

Academics 
With an emphasis on both academia and biblical applications, CCA has developed a custom set of academic standards that meet or exceed state and national standards, derived from the following:

 Liberty Christian Academy academic standards
 Florida Department of Education standards
 International Society for Technology in Education standards
 American Council on the Teaching of Foreign Languages standards
 Curriculum Planning and Learning Management Systems standards
 Department of Defense standards

Students of every grade level have study of the Bible integrated into the curriculum, along with core academic classes.

High school 
The high school offers 35 Dual Enrollment (DE) and Advanced Placement (AP) courses offered across all academic disciplines. Students are required to take one full credit of Bible for each year in attendance at CCA. Students have the option to participate in Endorsements, areas of special academic emphasis that require additional courses and/or extracurricular activities. Endorsement programs include Fine Arts, Ministry, STEM, and World Language.

Elementary school 
The elementary school curriculum focuses on five areas: Bible, Math, English, Science, and Social Studies. Students then participate in "weekly specials" that include Fine Arts, Music, Physical Education, Spanish, and STEM. An optional Spanish Immersion Program through add.a.lingua] was introduced in the 2017–2018 school year where core classes are taught in Spanish with the goal of helping students become bilingual.

Tuition 
Tuition varies by grade level. Tuition for the 2021-2022 academic year for high school students is $14,425. Tuition assistance is available by application, and the school also accepts external scholarships including: Step Up for Students Scholarship, Gardiner Scholarship (PLSA), John McKay Scholarship, and Folds of Honor.

Campus 
CCA sits on a 75-acre campus shared with Calvary Chapel Fort Lauderdale. The grounds host a football field, track, indoor gymnasium, blackbox theatre, and a 700-seat theatre. At the end of the 2017-2018 academic year, the school began a major security system upgrade, adding 240 security cameras across the campus.

Athletics
CCA is member of the Florida High School Athletic Association (FHSAA). It provides competitive athletic sports for grades 6-12, as well as after-school intramural sports for elementary students.

Athletic teams 
The school has 55+ interscholastic athletic teams across 18 different sports for students in grades 6-12. School mascot is the Eagle, which is inspired by Isaiah 40:31.

Titles 
The school has won the 2017 State Champions in volleyball and basketball, the 2012 1A state title for girls Track and Field, along with the 2016 State Champions in baseball.

Notable alumni
Luke Jackson (born 1991), baseball pitcher for the San Francisco Giants

Notable staff 

 Bob Coy (1985-2014) - Founding Pastor

References

Christian schools in Florida
Private elementary schools in Florida
Private high schools in Florida
Private middle schools in Florida
Educational institutions established in 2000
2000 establishments in Florida